Zukovsky or Zukofsky may refer to:

People

 Louis Zukovsky (1904–1978), an American poet whose surname has alternate spellings
 Paul Zukofsky (1943–2017), an American violinist and conductor
 Michele Zukovsky, an American clarinetist with the Los Angeles Philharmonic

Fictional characters
 Valentin Zukovsky, a fictional character whom actor Robbie Coltrane played in two James Bond films: GoldenEye and The World is Not Enough

See also

 Zhukovsky (surname)